Tarski–Grothendieck set theory (TG, named after mathematicians Alfred Tarski and Alexander Grothendieck) is an axiomatic set theory.  It is a non-conservative extension of Zermelo–Fraenkel set theory (ZFC) and is distinguished from other axiomatic set theories by the inclusion of Tarski's axiom, which states that for each set there is a Grothendieck universe it belongs to (see below). Tarski's axiom implies the existence of inaccessible cardinals, providing a richer ontology than ZFC.  For example, adding this axiom supports category theory.

The Mizar system and Metamath use Tarski–Grothendieck set theory for formal verification of proofs.

Axioms

Tarski–Grothendieck set theory starts with conventional Zermelo–Fraenkel set theory and then adds “Tarski's axiom”.  We will use the axioms, definitions, and notation of Mizar to describe it.  Mizar's basic objects and processes are fully formal; they are described informally below.  First, let us assume that:

 Given any set , the singleton  exists.
 Given any two sets, their unordered and ordered pairs exist.
 Given any set of sets, its union exists.

TG includes the following axioms, which are conventional because they are also part of ZFC:
 Set axiom:  Quantified variables range over sets alone; everything is a set (the same ontology as ZFC).
 Axiom of extensionality:  Two sets are identical if they have the same members.
 Axiom of regularity:  No set is a member of itself, and circular chains of membership are impossible.
 Axiom schema of replacement: Let the domain of the class function  be the set .

It is Tarski's axiom that distinguishes TG from other axiomatic set theories. Tarski's axiom also implies the axioms of infinity, choice, and power set. It also implies the existence of inaccessible cardinals, thanks to which the ontology of TG is much richer than that of conventional set theories such as ZFC.

 Tarski's axiom (adapted from Tarski 1939). For every set , there exists a set  whose members include:

-  itself;

More formally:

where “” denotes the power class of x and “” denotes equinumerosity. What Tarski's axiom states (in the vernacular) is that for each set  there is a Grothendieck universe it belongs to.

It's like a “universal set” except that of course it is not a member of itself and is not a set of all sets. That's the guaranteed Grothendieck universe it belongs to. And then any such  is itself a member of an even larger “almost universal set” and so on. It's one of the strong cardinality axioms guaranteeing vastly more sets than one normally assumes to exist.

Implementation in the Mizar system

The Mizar language, underlying the implementation of TG and providing its logical syntax, is typed and the types are assumed to be non-empty. Hence, the theory is implicitly taken to be non-empty. The existence axioms, e.g. the existence of the unordered pair, is also implemented indirectly by the definition of term constructors.

The system includes equality, the membership predicate and the following standard definitions:
 Singleton:  A set with one member;
 Unordered pair:  A set with two distinct members. ;
 Ordered pair:  The set ;
 Subset:  A set all of whose members are members of another given set;

Implementation in Metamath

The Metamath system supports arbitrary higher-order logics, but it is typically used with the "set.mm" definitions of axioms.  The ax-groth axiom adds Tarski's axiom, which in Metamath is defined as follows:

⊢ ∃y(x ∈ y ∧ ∀z ∈ y (∀w(w ⊆ z → w ∈ y) ∧ ∃w ∈ y ∀v(v ⊆ z → v ∈ w)) ∧ ∀z(z ⊆ y → (z ≈ y ∨ z ∈ y)))

See also
Axiom of limitation of size

Notes

References
Andreas Blass, I.M. Dimitriou, and Benedikt Löwe (2007) "Inaccessible Cardinals without the Axiom of Choice," Fundamenta Mathematicae 194: 179-89.
 
 Patrick Suppes (1960) Axiomatic Set Theory. Van Nostrand. Dover reprint, 1972.

External links
Trybulec, Andrzej, 1989, "Tarski–Grothendieck Set Theory", Journal of Formalized Mathematics.
Metamath: "Proof Explorer Home Page." Scroll down to "Grothendieck's Axiom."
 PlanetMath: "Tarski's Axiom"

Systems of set theory